The Narrow is an alternative rock band from Pretoria, South Africa.

Biography
The band was formed in 2002 by guitarists Emile and Sid, bassist Jow Feldtmann and drummer Nelius de Lange. Shortly thereafter Emile brought in his former Not My Dog bandmate Hanu de Jong as the band's vocalist, completing the line up.

In early 2003 the band released their debut album Self Conscious to wide critical acclaim and a South African Music Awards (SAMA) nomination. In June that same year founding guitarist Sid left the band and was replaced by Deon Kruger.

In 2004 the band released their follow-up album Travellers. The album earned the band their second SAMA nomination and the single "Lonely-Lonely" helped launch the band to greater recognition and popularity.

In 2005 the band remastered and re-released both their albums, with added tracks of old and new unreleased material.

After a slew of international stints the band underwent a brief hiatus in 2007 but became active again in 2008.

In 2010 they released their 3rd full-length album You Don't Get to Quit, earning them their third SAMA nomination. In 2012 the band released Understated, featuring acoustic versions of previously released material.

The band are known for their intense and energetic live shows, becoming important fixtures and regular headliners of various major South African rock festivals such as Oppikoppi, Ramfest, Woodstock and Seasons Wither. The band has opened up for various international acts, including The Used, Violent Femmes, In Flames, Underoath and Deftones.

Band members
 Hanu de Jong - Vocals
 Emile de Jong - Guitar
 Deon Kruger - Guitar
 Jow Feldtmann - Bass
 Nelius De Lange - Drums

Touring
 Schalk Boshoff - Drums
 Ryan Greenwood - Drums

Discography
Full Length
 2003 Self Conscious
 2004 Travellers
 2005 Self Conscious (special edition)
 2005 Travellers (special edition)
 2010 You Don't Get to Quit
 2017 Dream of Perelandra

EPs
 2004 Split
 2006 Sharing The Turbulence
 2015 Crocodiles

Compilations
 2010 Definitively Recycled
 2012 Understated (acoustic album)

References

External links
 The Narrow site
 MySpace
 Facebook

South African heavy metal musical groups